Chrášťany is a municipality and village in Benešov District in the Central Bohemian Region of the Czech Republic. It has about 200 inhabitants.

Administrative parts
Villages of Benice, Černíkovice and Soběšovice are administrative parts of Chrášťany.

References

Villages in Benešov District